This article represents the structure of the Swiss Armed Forces as of 1 January 2018:

 Chief of the Armed Forces 

 Chief of the Armed Forces, in Bern
 Chief of the Armed Forces Chief of Staff
  Joint Operations Command / Deputy Chief of the Armed Forces, in Bern
  Training Command, in Bern
 Armed Forces Command Support Organisation, in Bern
 Armed Forces Logistics Organisation, in Bern
 Armed Forces Staff, in Bern
 Medical Service, in Ittigen
 Armed Forces Planning / Deputy Chief of the Armed Forces Staff
 Defense International Relationships
 Defense Corporate Development / Military Doctrine
 Defense Personnel Management
 Defense Finance Management
 Defense Real Estate Management
 Military Aviation Authority, at Payerne Air Base

Other Swiss general officers are:

 Defense Attaché Washington 
 Defense Attaché Berlin 
 Defense Attaché Paris 
 Project Manager Support Command 
 Swiss Senior Staff Officer at the Geneva Centre for Security Policy 
 Swiss Senior Staff Officer at KFOR 
 Swiss Military Representative at NATO/EU 

The Medical Service consists of the following organizational units

 Medical Service, in Ittigen
 Armed Forces Pharmacy, in Ittigen
 Armed Forces Nursing Service, in Ittigen
 Armed Forces Veterinary Service, in Ittigen
 Medical Service Personnel Matters, in Ittigen
 Medical Service Inspectorate, in Ittigen
 Coordinated Medical Service, in Ittigen
 Military Medical Service, in Ittigen
 6x Regional Medical Centres in Bière, Chur/Frauenfeld, Monteceneri/Emmen, Payerne, Thun, and Wangen an der Aare
 6x Recruitment Centres in Aarau, Mels, Monteceneri, Payerne, Rüti, and Sumiswald
 Military and Disaster Medicine Competence Centre, in Ittigen
 Medical NBC Defense, in Ittigen
 Medical Intelligence, in Ittigen

 Joint Operations Command 
The Joint Operations Command is responsible for planning and conducting Swiss Armed Forces operations.

  Joint Operations Command, in Bern
  Deputy Commander Joint Operations Command, in Bern
  Joint Operations Command Staff, in Bern
  Land Forces, in Bern
  1st Mechanised Brigade, in Morges
  4th Mechanised Brigade, in Liestal
  11th Mechanised Brigade, in Chur
  Air Force, in Bern
  Air Force Training and Education Brigade, at Payerne Air Base
  33rd Anti-aircraft Training Unit, at Emmen Air Base
  1st Territorial Division, in Morges
  2nd Territorial Division, in Aarau
  3rd Territorial Division, in Altdorf
  4th Territorial Division, in St. Gallen
  Military Police Command, in Sitten
  Military Intelligence Service / Preventive Armed Forces Protection Service, in Bern
 Special Forces Command, in Rivera
  SWISSINT Competence Centre, in Oberdorf

The deputy commanders of the Land Forces, Air Force, and the four territorial divisions are brigadier generals.

 Land Forces 
The Land Forces commands the armed forces' maneuver formations.

  Land Forces, in Bern
 20th Land Forces Staff Battalion, in Zurich
 Command and Specialist Systems Competence Centre (in Thun develops and maintains the Land Forces' command and control System and the Integrated Artillery Command and Fire Control System
 Land Forces Military Support
 Territorial Divisions Military Support
 Technical Support

 1st Mechanised Brigade 

The 1st Mechanised Brigade is based in the French-speaking Romandy region and the Canton of Bern.

  1st Mechanised Brigade, in Morges
 1st Mechanised Brigade Staff Battalion
 1st Reconnaissance Battalion
 12th Panzer Battalion, in Bern
 17th Mechanised Battalion
 18th Mechanised Battalion
 1st Artillery Group
 1st Armoured Sapper Battalion

 4th Mechanised Brigade 
The 4th Mechanised Brigade is based in central Switzerland, with the 49th Artillery Group based in the Italian-speaking Canton of Ticino.

  4th Mechanised Brigade, in Liestal
 4th Mechanised Brigade Staff Battalion
 4th Reconnaissance Battalion
 5th Reconnaissance Battalion
 10th Artillery Group
 49th Artillery Group
 26th Bridge Engineer Battalion

 11th Mechanised Brigade 

The 11th Mechanised Brigade is based in the Eastern part of German-speaking Switzerland.

  11th Mechanised Brigade, in Chur
 11th Mechanised Brigade Staff Battalion
 11th Reconnaissance Battalion
 13th Panzer Battalion
 14th Mechanised Battalion
 29th Mechanised Battalion
 16th Artillery Group
 11th Armoured Sapper Battalion

 Land Forces battalions structure 
The battalions of the Land Forces field the following subunits:

 Brigade staff battalions:
 Staff company, brigade staff operations company, brigade staff support company, signal company, protection company, and a fire control center battery
 Reconnaissance battalions:
 Staff company, 3x reconnaissance companies with Eagle I and Eagle II armoured reconnaissance vehicles (to be replaced by Eagle V 6x6 TASYS armoured reconnaissance vehicles), and a logistic company
 Panzer and Mechanised battalions:
 Staff company, 2x Panzer companies with Leopard 2A4 WE main battle tanks, 2x Panzergrenadier companies with CV9030CH infantry fighting vehicles, and a logistic company
 Artillery groups:
 Fire control battery, 3x artillery batteries with M109 KAWEST 155mm self-propelled howitzers and Eagle III armoured artillery command vehicles, and a logistic battery (each group will add a mortar battery with eight 120mm mortars mounted on Piranha V armoured fighting vehicles by 2024)
 Armoured sapper battalions:
 Staff company, 3x armoured sapper companies with Kodiak armoured engineering vehicles and Leguan armoured vehicle-launched bridges, and a logistic company
 Bridge engineer battalion:
 Staff company, 3x bridge engineer companies with Motorized Floating Bridges, Medium Girder Bridges and 46m Support Bridges, and a logistic company

 Air Force 

  Air Force, in Bern
 Air Force Staff, in Bern
  Air Force Operations Centre, at Dübendorf Air Base
 FLORAKO radar stations on Pilatus, Scopi, Weisshorn and Weissfluh mountains
 Swiss Federal Government's Air Transport Service, at Bern Airport (VIP flights)
 Aeromedical Center, at Dübendorf Air Base
 AMC Director's Staff
 Flight Medicine Section
 Flight Psychology Section

 Air Force Training and Education Brigade 

The Air Force Training and Education Brigade trains the air force's personnel.

  Air Force Training and Education Brigade, at Payerne Air Base
  Air Force Training and Education Brigade Staff, at Payerne Air Base
 Intelligence Service Training Cell, at Emmen Air Base trains air force's intelligence officers
 Parachute Reconnaissance Cell, at Locarno Air Base
 81st Aviation School, at Payerne Air Base trains the air force's ground personnel
 82nd Air Force Training Command, at Dübendorf Air Base trains the air force's intelligence, signals, command support, and radar troops
 84th Unmanned Aerial Vehicle Command, at Emmen Air Base
 7th Unmanned Aerial Vehicle Squadron, at Emmen Air Base with six Hermes 900 unmanned aerial vehicles
 85th Air Force Pilots School, at Locarno Air Base trains the air force's pilots
 14th Instrument Flying Squadron, at Locarno Air Base with PC-7 Turbo Trainer and PC-21 planes
 Air Force Officers School, at Payerne Air Base
 1st Air Force Intelligence Group, at Dübendorf Air Base
 2nd Air Force Intelligence Group, at Dübendorf Air Base
 2nd Mobile Air Force Radar Group, at Dübendorf Air Base

The groups of the Air Force Training and Education Brigade field the following subunits:

 Air force intelligence groups:
 Staff company, 4x air force intelligence companies
 Mobile air force radar group:
 Staff company, 2x mobile air force radar companies with TAFLIR mobile radars

 Airfield Command Alpnach/Dübendorf 

The Airfield Command Alpnach/Dübendorf consists of two helicopter formations.

 Airfield Command Alpnach/Dübendorf, at Alpnach Air Base
 Airfield Command Staff, at Alpnach Air Base
 2nd Air Transport Wing
 6th Air Transport Squadron, with Super Puma, Cougar and EC 635 helicopters
 8th Air Transport Squadron, with Super Puma, Cougar and EC 635 helicopters
 Flight Operations Support
 Airfield Dübendorf, at Dübendorf Air Base
 3rd Air Transport Wing
 3rd Air Transport Squadron, with Super Puma, Cougar and EC 635 helicopters
 4th Air Transport Squadron, with Super Puma, Cougar and EC 635 helicopters
 Flight Operations Support

 Airfield Command Emmen 
Airfield Command Emmen besides its own flying squadrons also hosts units of the Air Force Training and Education Brigade and the Patrouille Suisse aerobatic team.

 Airfield Command Emmen, at Emmen Air Base
 Airfield Command Staff
 Flight Operations
 Patrouille Suisse with twelve F-5E Tiger II fighter jets
 7th Air Transport Squadron with PC-6 Porter planes
 12th Target Squadron with F-5 fighter jets and PC-9 planes
 19th Fighter Squadron with F-5 fighter jets
 Flight Simulators
 Flight Operations Support

 Airfield Command Locarno 
Airfield Command Locarno hosts and supports the 85th Air Force Pilots School, maintains the PC-6 Porter, PC-7 Turbo Trainer, and PC-9 planes, and hosts the parachute training of the Swiss Armed Forces.

 Airfield Command Locarno, at Locarno Air Base
 Airfield Command Staff
 Flight Operations Support, supports the 14th Instrument Flying Squadron
 Flight Simulators, with PC-7 Turbo Trainer simulators

 Airfield Command Meiringen/Bern 

Airfield Command Meiringen/Bern is one of two fighter bases of the air force. The command also supports the Swiss Federal Government's Air Transport Service at Bern Airport.

 Airfield Command Meiringen/Bern, at Meiringen Air Base
 Airfield Command Staff
 13th Fighter Wing
 8th Fighter Squadron with F-5 fighter jets
 11th Fighter Squadron with F/A-18 Hornet fighter jets
 Flight Operations Support

 Airfield Command Payerne 

Airfield Command Payerne is one of two fighter bases of the air force. The command also supports the Swiss Federal Government's Air Transport Service at Bern Airport.

 Airfield Command Payerne, at Payerne Air Base
 Airfield Command Staff
 1st Air Transport Wing
 1st Air Transport Squadron, with Super Puma, Cougar and EC 635 helicopters
 5th Air Transport Squadron, with Super Puma, Cougar and EC 635 helicopters
 11th Fighter Wing
 17th Fighter Squadron with F/A-18 Hornet fighter jets
 18th Fighter Squadron with F/A-18 Hornet fighter jets
 14th Fighter Wing, part-time conscript unit
 6th Fighter Squadron with F-5 fighter jets
 Flight Operations Support
 Simulation and Formation Support with F/A-18 Hornet simulators and Simulated Aircraft Maintenance Trainers
 Polymechanics and Electronics Apprentices Formation Centre
 Sion Polymechanics Apprentices Formation Centre, at Sion Airport

 33rd Anti-aircraft Training Unit 

The 33rd Anti-aircraft Training Unit trains the armed forces' air defense troops. In wartime the guided missiles groups' fire units would be dispersed to protect formations or locations, while the medium anti-aircraft group's batteries would each protect an air force airfield.

  33rd Anti-aircraft Training Unit, at Emmen Air Base
 33rd Anti-aircraft Training Unit Staff
 33rd Basic and Advanced Training Ground-based Air-defense Command
 Ground-based Air-defense 2020 Command
 33rd Ground-based Air-defense Training Command
 1st Light Anti-aircraft Guided Missiles Group
 4th Mobile Anti-aircraft Guided Missiles Group
 5th Light Anti-aircraft Guided Missiles Group
 7th Light Anti-aircraft Guided Missiles Group
 11th Mobile Anti-aircraft Guided Missiles Group
 32nd Medium Anti-aircraft Group
 34th Medium Anti-aircraft Group
 45th Medium Anti-aircraft Group

The anti-aircraft groups field the following subunits:

 Light anti-aircraft guided missile groups:
 2x light anti-aircraft guided missile batteries with 16 fire units and four observer teams each; each fire unit fields one FIM-92 Stinger launcher and carries three missiles in total, while each observer team operates one ALERT tactical radar
 Mobile anti-aircraft guided missile groups:
 2x mobile anti-aircraft guided missile batteries with ten fire units each; each fire unit fields one Rapier missile system consisting of one launcher with four missiles, one tacking radar, one optical tracking unit, and ten replacement missiles
 Medium anti-aircraft groups:
 2x medium anti-aircraft batteries with four fire units each; each fire unit fields one Skyguard radar and two GDF 005 35mm twin cannons

 Wartime air wing structure 
In peace the Swiss air bases are operated by a small professional cadre and rotating conscript troops. In wartime the six wings of the air force would increase in size to allow for high intensity operations. In wartime the structure of the Swiss air wings would be as follows:

For the three (1st, 2nd, 3rd) transport wings the example given is for the 2nd Air Transport Wing (peacetime units in bold):

 2nd Air Transport Command
 2nd Air Transport Wing
 6th Air Transport Squadron
 8th Air Transport Squadron
 2nd Air Transport Company
 2nd Air Transport Group
 2nd Air Transport Command Support Company
 2nd Air Transport Support Company
 2nd Air Transport Logistic Company
 2nd Air Transport Protection Company

For the three (11th, 13th, 14th) fighter wings the example given is for the 13th Fighter Wing (peacetime units in bold):

 11th Aviation Unit Command
 11th Fighter Wing
 17th Fighter Squadron
 18th Fighter Squadron
 11th Fighter Company
 11th Airfield Group
 11th Fighter Command Support Company
 11th Fighter Support Company
 11th Fighter Logistic Company
 11th Air Base Protection Company

 1st Territorial Division 
The 1st Territorial Division is based in the French-speaking Romandy region and the bilingual Canton of Bern. Its area of responsibility includes the cantons of Bern, Fribourg, Geneva, Jura, Neuchâtel, Valais, and Vaud.

  1st Territorial Division, in Morges
  1st Engineer Staff overseeing buildings and constructions
  1st Coordination Office managing the training areas
 1st Territorial Division Staff Battalion
 1st Carabiniers Battalion
 7th Mountain Infantry Battalion
 13th Infantry Battalion
 14th Carabiniers Battalion
 19th Infantry Battalion
 2nd Engineer Battalion
 1st Civil Protection Battalion
 Patrouille des Glaciers Command

 2nd Territorial Division 
The 2nd Territorial Division is based in the German-speaking part of Northern Switzerland and responsible for the cantons of Aargau, Basel-Stadt, Basel-Landschaft, Luzern, Nidwalden, Obwalden, and Solothurn.

  2nd Territorial Division, in Aarau
  2nd Engineer Staff overseeing buildings and constructions
  2nd Coordination Office managing the training areas
 2nd Territorial Division Staff Battalion
 11th Infantry Battalion
 20th Infantry Battalion
 56th Infantry Battalion
 97th Infantry Battalion
 6th Engineer Battalion
 2nd Civil Protection Battalion

 3rd Territorial Division 
The 3rd Territorial Division is based in the German-speaking central part of Switzerland and the Italian-speaking Canton of Ticino. Its area of responsibility includes the cantons of Graubünden, Schwyz, Ticino, Uri, and Zug.

  3rd Territorial Division, in Altdorf
  3rd Engineer Staff overseeing buildings and constructions
  3rd Coordination Office managing the training areas
 3rd Territorial Division Staff Battalion
 11th Mountain Infantry Battalion
 30th Mountain Infantry Battalion
 48th Mountain Infantry Battalion
 91st Mountain Infantry Battalion
 9th Engineer Battalion
 3rd Civil Protection Battalion

 4th Territorial Division 
The 4th Territorial Division is based in the German-speaking Eastern part of Switzerland and responsible for the cantons of Appenzell Ausserrhoden, Appenzell Innerrhoden, Glarus, St. Gallen, Schaffhausen, Thurgau, and Zürich.

  4th Territorial Division, in St. Gallen
  4th Engineer Staff overseeing buildings and constructions
  4th Coordination Office managing the training areas
 4th Territorial Division Staff Battalion
 6th Mountain Schützen Battalion
 61st Infantry Battalion
 65th Infantry Battalion
 85th Mountain Infantry Battalion
 23rd Engineer Battalion
 4th Civil Protection Battalion

 Territorial Division battalion structure 
The battalions of the territorial divisions field the following subunits:

 Territorial division staff battalions:
 Territorial division staff company, territorial division staff operations company, signal company, protection company, and a reconnaissance company
 Infantry, carabiniers, mountain infantry, and mountain Schützen battalions:
 Staff company, 3x infantry companies with a mix of Piranha and Duro IIIP armoured fighting vehicles, and a combat support company with an 81mm mortar platoon, an artillery observer platoon, and a sniper platoon
 Engineer battalions:
 Staff company, 2x sapper companies, 1x bridge engineer company with Motorized Floating Bridges, Medium Girder Bridges, and 46m Support Bridges
 Civil protection battalions:
 Staff company, 3x civil protection companies

 Military Police Command 
The Military Police Command is the Swiss Armed forces Military Police formation and staffed with professional and conscript soldiers.

  Military Police Command, in Sitten
 Military Police Command Staff
 Military Police Operations Centre
 Military Police Situation Centre
 Military Police Security Transports
 Military Police Operations Command
 Military Accident and Damage Prevention
 Military Criminal Police
 Panzer Transport Office
 Legal Assistance Office
 Military Police Security Service Operations Command guarding critical militaryinfrastructure
 Military Police Search and Protection Operations Command tasked with preventing espionage, sabotage, and crime
 1st Military Police Battalion
 2nd Military Police Battalion
 3rd Military Police Battalion
 4th Military Police Battalion
 Military Police Competence Centre training members of the military police
 Military Police Readiness Company

The battalions of the Military Police Command field the following subunits:

 Military police battalions:
 Military police staff company, 2x military police companies, and a military police grenadier company

 Special Forces Command 
The Special Forces Command (abbreviated KSK) is based in the Canton of Ticino.

 Special Forces Command, in Rivera
 Special Forces Command Staff Battalion, in Monteceneri
  20th Grenadier Battalion, in Isone
 30th Grenadier Battalion, in Isone
 17th Parachute Reconnaissance Company, in Isone
 10th Armed Forces Reconnaissance Detachment (trilingual Tier 1 Special Forces unit), in Monteceneri
 Military Police Special Detachment (VIP protection unit), in Worblaufen
 Special Forces Training Centre, at the Isone Weapons Range

The battalions of the Special Forces Command field the following subunits:

 Special forces command staff battalion:
 Staff company, command operations company, protection company, and a Grenadier support company
 Grenadier battalions:
 Grenadier staff company, 3x Grenadier companies (Direct Action), Grenadier reconnaissance company (Special Reconnaissance), and a Grenadier support company

 Training Command 
The Training Command is responsible for planning, steering and carrying out the training and education of troops of all ranks, including officers, units and staffs.

  Training Command, in Bern
  Training Command Staff, in Bern
 Armed Forces College / Deputy Commander Training Command, in Luzern
 General Staff School, in Kriens
 Military Academy at ETH Zurich, in Birmensdorf
 Central School, in Luzern
 Career NCO School, in Herisau
  Armed Forces Personnel, in Bern
  Infantry Training Unit, in Colombier
  Panzer and Artillery Training Unit, in Thun
  Engineer/ Civil Protection/ NBC Training Unit, in Zuchwil
  Command Support Training Unit, at Dübendorf Air Base
  Logistic Training Unit, in Thun
  Armed Forces Training Centre, in Walenstadt

 Armed Forces College 
The Armed Forces College provides leadership and staff training for conscript officers, career officers and non-commissioned officers. Furthermore the college's Military Academy at ETH Zurich is Switzerland's leading military science research institution.

 Armed Forces College, in Luzern
 General Staff School, in Kriens
 Military Academy at ETH Zurich, in Birmensdorf
 Central School, in Luzern
 Leadership Training Centre
 Formation Leadership Course
 Unit Leadership Course
 Management, Information and Communication Training Command
 Career NCO School, in Herisau
 Operational Training, in Bern

 Armed Forces Personnel 
The Armed Forces Personnel is the personnel management department of the Swiss Armed Forces.

  Armed Forces Personnel, in Bern
 Governance and Guidelines
 Human Resources Management
 Recruitment Command
 Swiss Armed Forces Diversity
 Armed Forces Service Member Prevention and Care, in Thun
 Armed Forces Pastoral Care, in Thun
 Armed Forces Psychological-pedagogical Service, in Thun
 Armed Forces Social Service, in Thun

 Infantry Training Unit 
The Infantry Training Unit trains the armed forces' infantry troops, military police, and musicians.

  Infantry Training Unit, in Colombier
 2nd Infantry School, in Colombier
 Chamblon Weapons Range, in Chamblon
 10th Infantry Officers School, in Liestal
 11th Infantry School, in St. Gallen
 12th Infantry School, in Chur
 Chur Weapons Range, in Chur
 14th Infantry Full Time Troops School, in Birmensdorf
 18th Infantry Training and Formation, in Colombier
 19th Military Police School, in Sion
 Armed Forces Mountain Service Competence Centre, in Andermatt
 15th Mountain Specialists School
 1st Mountain Specialists Group
 104th/204th Mountain Specialists Readiness  Detachment
 Military Music Competence Centre, in Bern
 Command and Training, in Aarau
 Swiss Military Bands with 4x professional orchestras: the Central Band, Brass Band, Big Band and Symphony Wind Orchestra
 11x Military bands with conscript recruits

 Panzer and Artillery Training Unit 
The Panzer and Artillery Training Unit trains the armed forces' armoured and artillery troops, and the troops of the territorial divisions' staff battalions.

  Panzer and Artillery Training Unit, in Thun
 21st Panzer School, in Thun
 22nd Panzer/Artillery Officers School, in Thun
 31st Artillery and Reconnaissance School, in Bière
 Thun Weapons Range/ Mechanised Training Centre, in Thun
 Bière Weapons Range/ Artillery Training Centre, in Bière
 Simplon Artillery Shooting Range (at the Simplon Pass
 2nd Trials/ Unit Training, in Thun manages the development, procurement and field trials of armoured and artillery equipment

 Engineer/ Civil Protection/ NBC Training Unit 
The Engineer/ Civil Protection/ NBC Training Unit trains the armed forces' engineer, civil protection, CBRN defense, disaster relief, and demining troops. The unit is also responsible for the Swiss Armed Forces naval troops and divers, and the armed forces athletes and sport training.

  Engineer/ Civil Protection/ NBC Training Unit, in Zuchwil
 73rd Engineer School, in Brugg
 74th Engineer/Civil Protection Seminars+Courses, in Bremgarten trains non-commissioned officers and officers 
 Armed Forces Divers Centre
 75th Civil Protection School, in Wangen an der Aare
 76th Civil Protection Troops Training Centre, in Bernex
 Geneva Weapons Range, in Geneva
 Disaster Relief Readiness Battalion, in Bremgarten deployable within hours for national and international disaster relief
 NBC Defense-Explosive Ordnance Disposal and Mine Clearance Competence Centre, in Spiez
 77th NBC Defense School, in Spiez
 1st NBC Defense Laboratory, in Spiez
 10th NBC Defense Battalion, in Luzern
 NBC Defense Readiness Company(), in Spiez
 Ordnance Disposal and Mine Clearance Command (in Spiez
 Unexploded Ordnance Reporting Centre, in Spiez
 Armed Forces Sport Competence Centre, in Magglingen
 10th Motor Boat Company, in Zuchwil patrolling the Swiss border lakes

 Command Support Training Unit 
The Command Support Training Unit trains the armed forces' signal, electronic warfare, and command support troops.

  Command Support Training Unit, at Dübendorf Air Base
 30th Command Support Officers School, in Bülach
 61st Information Technology School, in Frauenfeld
 62nd Signal School, in Kloten
 63rd Command Support School, in Bülach
 64th Electronic Warfare School, in Thun
 Frauenfeld Weapons Range, in Frauenfeld
 Kloten-Bülach Weapons Range, in Kloten and Bülach

 Logistic Training Unit 

The Logistic Training Unit trains the armed forces' medical, logistics, movement control, transport, maintenance, and veterinary troops, and the armed forces' animals.

  Logistic Training Unit, in Thun
 40th Logistic Officers School, in Bern
 41st Hospital School, at the Moudon Weapons Range
 41st Military Doctors Non-Commissioned Officers/Officers School, at the Moudon Weapons Range
 42nd Medical School, in Airolo
 43rd Maintenance School, in Thun
 45th Supply School, in Fribourg
 47th Movement Control and Transport School, in Romont
 49th Higher Non-commissioned Officer Courses, in Bern
 Catering Training Centre, in Thun
 Swiss Armed Forces Culinary Team
 Veterinary Service and Armed Forces Animals Competence Centre, in Bern
 13th Veterinary and Armed Forces Animals Group, in Schönbühl
 3x Train Columns, with around 100 horses each
 Veterinary Company
 Dog Handler Company, with around 100 dogs
 Armed Forces Driving Training Competence Centre, in Thun

 Armed Forces Training Centre 
The Armed Forces Training Centre is responsible for the initial and continuing education of the armed forces' professional personnel, combat exercises with simulation support, and safety-related matters on all shooting ranges.

  Armed Forces Training Centre, in Walenstadt
 Seminars and Courses Command, in Walenstadt
 Combat Training Centre Command West, in Bure
 Bure Weapons Range, in Bure
 Combat Training Centre Command East, in Walenstadt
 Walenstadt Weapons Range, in Walenstadt
 St. Luzisteig Shooting Range (in Maienfeld
 Hinterrhein Shooting Range (in Hinterrhein
 Wichlen Shooting Range (in Elm
 Trials and Development Office, in Walenstadt manages the development, procurement and field trials of infantry equipment and gear

 Armed Forces Command Support Organisation 
The Armed Forces Command Support Organisation operates the Swiss military's information and communications network and the electronic operations centres. The Armed Forces Command Support Organisation and the Armed Forces Logistics Organisation are in the process of being merged to form a new Support Command.

 Armed Forces Command Support Organisation, in Bern
 Cyber Security Centre, protects the information and communications network 
 Mission Control Centre, monitors and steers the information and communications network 
 Electronic Operations Centre, operates the Signals Intelligence and Electronic Warfare network

 41st Command Support Brigade 
The 41st Command Support Brigade is the military part of the Command Support Organisation and supports the operational units of the Armed Forces.

 41st Command Support Brigade, in Bülach
 Systems/Cadre Training/Support Command
 41st Command Support Battalion
 11th Headquarters Battalion
 22nd Headquarters Battalion
 25th Headquarters Battalion
 4th Signal Battalion, supporting the Air Force
 16th Signal Battalion
 17th Signal Battalion
 21st Signal Battalion
 32nd Signal Battalion
 46th Electronic Group, radio reconnaissance
 51st Electronic Warfare Group
 52nd Electronic Warfare Group

The battalions of the 41st Command Support Brigade field the following subunits:

 Headquarters battalions:
 Staff company, operations company, signal company, protection company, transport company
 Command support battalion:
 Staff company, 3x command support companies, protection company
 Signal battalions:
 Staff company, 4x signal companies
 Electronic warfare groups:
 Staff company, 2x electronic warfare companies

 Armed Forces Logistics Organisation 
The Armed Forces Logistics Organisation prepares and maintains the materiel and infrastructures of the Swiss Armed Forces. The Logistics Organisation's areas not assigned to the 1st Logistic Brigade are manned and managed by civilian staff. The Armed Forces Logistics Organisation and the Armed Forces Command Support Organisation are in the process of being merged to form a new Support Command.

 Armed Forces Logistics Organisation, in Bern
 Armed Forces Logistic Centre Othmarsingen
 Armed Forces Logistic Centre Hinwil
 Armed Forces Logistic Centre Thun
 Armed Forces Logistic Centre Monteceneri
 Armed Forces Logistic Centre Grolley
 Electronic Media Centre, in Bern
 Armed Forces Road Traffic and Naval Shipping Office, in Bern (

 1st Logistic Brigade 
The 1st Logistic Brigade is the military part of the Logistics Organisation and supports the operational units of the Armed Forces.

 1st Logistic Brigade''', in Ittigen
 1st Logistic Brigade Staff Company
 1st Movement Control and Transport Battalion
 1st Infrastructure Battalion, operates underground command centres and protects above-ground headquarters
 21st Logistic Battalion
 51st Logistic Battalion
 52nd Logistic Battalion
 92nd Logistic Battalion
 101st Logistic Battalion
 61st Logistic Support Battalion
 2nd Hospital Battalion
 5th Hospital Battalion
 66th Hospital Battalion
 75th Hospital Battalion
 81st Medical Logistics Battalion
 9th Medical Support Battalion
 104th/204th Logistic Readiness Company

The battalions of the 1st Logistic Brigade field the following subunits:

 Movement control and transport battalion:
 Staff company, 3x movement control companies, 3x transport companies
 Logistic battalions:
 Staff company, 2x logistic companies (the battalions will add a third logistic company in 2021 and a fourth logistic company in 2023)
 Hospital battalions:
 Staff company, 2x hospital companies
 Medical logistics battalion:
 Staff company, 3x medical logistics companies

Armed Forces Organization Graphic

References

External links 
 Website of the Swiss Armed Forces

Swiss Armed Forces